Stylus is a dynamic stylesheet preprocessor language that is compiled into Cascading Style Sheets (CSS). Its design is influenced by Sass and LESS. It is regarded as the fourth most used CSS preprocessor syntax. It was created by TJ Holowaychuk, a former programmer for Node.js and the creator of the Luna language. It is written in JADE and Node.js.

Selectors 
Unlike CSS, which uses braces to open and close declaration blocks, indentation is used. Additionally, semi-colons are optionally omitted. Hence, the following CSS:
body {
    color: white;
} 
can be shortened to:
body 
    color: white
Further, colons and commas are also optional; that means the above can be written as,
body 
    color white

Variables 
Stylus allows variables to be defined, however unlike LESS and Sass, it doesn't use a symbol to define variables. Additionally, variable assignment is done automatically by separating the property and keyword(s). In this way, variables are similar to the variables in Python.
message = 'Hello, World!'

div::before
  content message
  color #ffffff

The Stylus compiler would translate the above document to:

div::before {
  content: 'Hello, World!';
  color: #ffffff;
}

Mixins and functions 
Both mixins and functions are defined in the same manner, but they are applied in different ways.

For example, if you wanted to define the CSS border radius property without having to use various Vendor Prefixes you can create:

border-radius(n)
  -webkit-border-radius n
  -moz-border-radius n
  border-radius n

then, to include this as a mixin, you would reference it as:

div.rectangle 
  border-radius(10px)

this would compile to:

div.rectangle {
  -webkit-border-radius: 10px;
  -moz-border-radius: 10px;
  border-radius: 10px;
}

Interpolation 
To include variables in arguments and identifiers, brace characters surround the variable(s). For example,  -webkit-{'border' + '-radius'}  evaluates to -webkit-border-radius

References

External links 
 
 Stylus source code repository (Git)
 Source code comparison with Sass/SCSS and LESS
 Online Stylus Compiler

Computer-related introductions in 2010
Free computer libraries
Software using the MIT license
Stylesheet languages